Hungary participated in the Eurovision Song Contest 2018. The local Media Services and Support Trust Fund (MTVA) and the Hungarian broadcaster Duna Media Service organised the national final A Dal 2018 in order to select the Hungarian entry for the 2018 contest in Lisbon, Portugal.

Background

Hungary's best placing in the contest was fourth, which they achieved with their début entry in 1994 with the song "Kinek mondjam el vétkeimet?" performed by Friderika Bayer. Hungary had attempted participate in the contest in 1993, however, their entry was eliminated in the preselection show Kvalifikacija za Millstreet. Hungary withdrew from the contest for six years between 1999 and 2004 and also missed the 2006 and 2010 contests. In 2014, Hungary achieved their second best result in the contest since their début, placing fifth with the song "Running" performed by András Kállay-Saunders. In 2016, Hungary placed 19th in the Eurovision final with the song "Pioneer" performed by Freddie. Next year they managed to finish in the top 10 again, now in the 8th place with "Origo" sang by Joci Pápai.

The Hungarian national broadcaster, Media Services and Support Trust Fund (MTVA), broadcasts the event within Hungary and organises the selection process for the nation's entry. MTVA confirmed their intentions to participate at the 2018 Eurovision Song Contest on 10 October 2017. Since 2012, MTVA has organised A Dal, a national selection show which has managed to, thus far, produce entries that have qualified the nation to the final of the Eurovision Song Contest each year and has resulted in three top 10 placings in 2013, 2014 and 2017.

Before Eurovision

A Dal 2018
A Dal 2018 was the seventh edition of the Hungarian national selection A Dal, which selected Hungary's entry for the Eurovision Song Contest 2018. The competition consisted of 30 entries competing in three heats, two semi-finals, and a final. The hosts are Kriszta Rátonyi and Freddie.

Format

Judges 
The jury panel consisted of four people:
 Judit Schell: actress
 Misi Mező: the lead singer and guitarist of the Hungarian band Magna Cum Laude
 Károly Frenreisz: one of the biggest names and composers of the so called Big Generation, band-member of Metro, LGT and Skorpió
 Miklós Both: two times Fonogram-award winner performer and composer.

Competing entries

On 10 October 2017, MTVA opened the submission period for artists and composers to submit their entries up until 20 November 2017.

Among the qualifiers, there are some artists and bands who made their comeback to A Dal-stage. Ceasefire X and Péter Szikszai (male part of Maya ‘n’ Peti) competed in 2016 as part of the boyband ByTheWay. 
Viki Eszes is in the running now with #yeahla, and took part in the past two times: in 2013 with the band Background, and in 2017 as part of The Couple. The Fourtissimo participated in A Dal once before; in 2015 they performed Run to You along Gyula Éliás. 
Gábor Heincz Biga and Viktor Király are no similar names in the national selection as well, they were part of the first ever A Dal-superfinal in 2012; the former with his song Learning to Let Go, and the latter with his siblings, performed Untried. Then in 2014 Viktor went on as a solo artist with Running Out of Time. 
Gabi Knoll took part in the 2014 national selection with her song Sweet Memories, but did not advance to the next round. 
Attila Kökény was the very first entrant of A Dal in 2012 with Tamara Bencsik. 
The lead singer of the band Leander Kills took part in the show before at two occasions: in 2015 with his former band called Leander Rising, and in 2017 with the existing formation, with the song called Élet. 
Maszkura és a tücsökraj competed in A Dal 2016, and gained the worst ever public score in the heats, scoring only 4 out of the maximum 10. This has since been given twice more in 2018, in the second semifinal for the entries sung by Cintia Horváth & Tomi Balogh  and Nikoletta Szőke, Attila Kökény and Róbert Szakcsi Lakatos.
The Noémo's lead singer, Noémi Takácsová "BülBüls" sang Minden mosoly in 2014, while Odett was a wildcard entry in the 2013 edition of the contest. Then A Dal 2016 started with her English language song Stardust, but did not advance to the next stage. 
Benjámin Pál (lead singer of Living Room) and the Peet Project were two of the qualifiers a year before with their entries Father's Eyes and Kill Your Monster.

Ádám Szabó was in the race in several occasions before: after a quick elimination in 2013, he came back in 2015, and placed second in the grand final with Give Me Your Love. In 2017 he sang the song Together, and this time he is back with his electro-rock formation called yesyes. 
The Matter (under the name Mushu) was a finalist in 2016 with Uncle Tom, and would've take part in the 2018 selection as well, but withdrew due to family issues. The band Patikadomb replaced them with Jó szelet!. 
Reni Tolvai made her first appearance in A Dal in 2012, and stayed at the first stage of the show with Élek a szemeidben. Later she came back in 2016, and advanced to the semi-finals. 
Tamás Vastag marked his third presence in the national selection, as he took part in A Dal 2013 with Holnaptól, and a year later with Állj meg villág.

Shows

Heats
Three heats took place on 20 January, 27 January and 3 February 2018. In each heat ten entries competed and six entries qualified to the semi-finals after two rounds of voting. In the first round of voting, five qualifiers were determined by the combination of scores from each judge and an aggregate score from a public SMS and mobile app vote. In the second round of voting, the remaining five entries that were not in the initial top five faced a public vote consisting of votes submitted through SMS in order to determine one additional qualifier.

In addition to the competing entries, other performers featured during the shows. János Kóbor and Balkan Fanatik performed as the interval act in heat 1, James Karácsony and Margaret Island performed in heat 2, and Fecó Balázs and Veca Janicsák performed in heat 3.

Semi-finals 
Two semi-finals took place on 10 and 17 February 2018. In each semi-final nine entries competed and four entries qualified to the final after two rounds of voting. In the first round of voting, three qualifiers were determined by the combination of scores from each judge and an aggregate score from a public SMS and mobile app vote. In the second round of voting, the remaining six entries that were not in the initial top three faced a public vote consisting of votes submitted through SMS in order to determine one additional qualifier.

In addition to the competing entries, other performers featured during the shows. Kimnowak and János Kardos-Horváth performed as the interval act in semi-final 1, and Adrien Szekeres and Charlie Horváth performed as the interval act for the show.

Final 
The final took place on 24 February 2018 where the eight entries that qualified from the semi-finals competed. The winner of the competition was be selected over two rounds of voting. In the first round, the jury determined the top four entries that would advance to the second round. The voting system for the four jurors was different from the method used in the heats and semi-finals. Each juror announced their scores after all songs had been performed rather than assigning scores following each performance and the jurors ranked their preferred top four entries and assign points in the following manner: 4 (lowest), 6, 8 and 10 (highest). The four entries with the highest total scores proceeded to the second round. In the second round, "Viszlát nyár" performed by AWS was selected as the winner via a public vote consisting of votes submitted through SMS, mobile app and online voting. In addition to the performances of the competing entries, guest performers included Joci Pápai, the winner of A Dal 2017 and representative of Hungary in the Eurovision Song Contest 2017, as well as one of the judges, Misi Mező and his band Magna Cum Laude, and György Ferenczi.

At Eurovision 
According to Eurovision rules, all nations with the exceptions of the host country and the "Big Five" (France, Germany, Italy, Spain and the United Kingdom) are required to qualify from one of two semi-finals in order to compete for the final; the top ten countries from each semi-final progress to the final. The European Broadcasting Union (EBU) split up the competing countries into six different pots based on voting patterns from previous contests, with countries with favourable voting histories put into the same pot. On 29 January 2018, a special allocation draw was held which placed each country into one of the two semi-finals, as well as which half of the show they would perform in. Hungary was placed into the second semi-final, to be held on 10 May 2018, and was scheduled to perform in the second half of the show.

Once all the competing songs for the 2018 contest had been released, the running order for the semi-finals was decided by the shows' producers rather than through another draw, so that similar songs were not placed next to each other. Hungary was set to perform in position 13, following the entry from Malta and preceding the entry from Latvia.

Voting
Voting during the three shows involved each country awarding two sets of points from 1-8, 10 and 12: one from their professional jury and the other from televoting. Each nation's jury consisted of five music industry professionals who are citizens of the country they represent, with their names published before the contest to ensure transparency. This jury judged each entry based on: vocal capacity; the stage performance; the song's composition and originality; and the overall impression by the act. In addition, no member of a national jury was permitted to be related in any way to any of the competing acts in such a way that they cannot vote impartially and independently. The individual rankings of each jury member as well as the nation's televoting results were released shortly after the grand final.

Below is a breakdown of points awarded to Hungary and awarded by Hungary in the second semi-final and grand final of the contest, and the breakdown of the jury voting and televoting conducted during the two shows:

Points awarded to Hungary

Points awarded by Hungary

Detailed voting results
The following members comprised the Hungarian jury:
  (James; jury chairperson)composer, guitarist, singer
 Balázs Bolykigospel singer, musician, composer, producer, lyricist, vocal coach
 Alexandra Pintácsi (Szandi)singer
 Lilla Vinczesinger
 Zoltán "Zé" Szabócomposer, producer

References

External links

A Dal official site

2018
Countries in the Eurovision Song Contest 2018
Eurovision